

Distribution

Further reading

References

8